The Ambassador of the United Kingdom to the Socialist Republic of Vietnam is the United Kingdom's foremost diplomatic representative in Vietnam, and head of the UK's diplomatic mission in Hanoi.

The list below shows British ambassadors to the Republic of Vietnam (South Vietnam) at its capital, Saigon (now Ho Chi Minh City), from 1954 after the Geneva Conference which separated French Indochina into its component states of Laos, Cambodia and Vietnam and temporarily partitioned Vietnam (although the Geneva agreement was not accepted by South Vietnam) until 1975 when North and South Vietnam were reunified. During that period the British government maintained a consulate-general in Hanoi. The British embassy is now in Hanoi with a consulate-general in Ho Chi Minh City.

Ambassadors
1954–1955: Sir Hubert Graves
1954–1957: Sir Hugh Stephenson
1957–1960: Sir Roderick Parkes
1960–1963: Henry Hohler
1963–1966: Gordon Etherington-Smith
1966–1967: Sir Peter Wilkinson
1967–1969: Lord MacLehose
1969–1971: Sir John Moreton
1972–1974: Brooks Richards
1974–1975: John Bushell
1975–1976: John Stewart
1976–1978: Robert Tesh
1978–1980: Sir John Margetson
1980–1982: Derek Tonkin
1982–1985: Sir Michael Pike
1985–1987: Richard Tallboys
1987–1990: Emrys Thomas Davies
1990–1997: Peter Keegan Williams
1997–2000: David Fall
2000–2003: Warwick Morris
2003–2007: Robert A. E. Gordon
2008–2010: Mark Kent
2010–2014: Antony Stokes
2014–2018: Giles Lever

2018–: Gareth Ward

References

External links
UK and Vietnam, gov.uk

Vietnam
 
United Kingdom